Septimiu Câmpeanu (born 12 July 1957) is a retired Romanian football striker. He is the nephew of Remus Câmpeanu who was a footballer that spent his entire career at Universitatea Cluj-Napoca.

International career
Septimiu Câmpeanu played four games at international level for Romania, making his debut in a 2–1 loss against Israel, when coach Valentin Stănescu sent him on the field in 46th minute of the game in order to replace Mircea Sandu. He also played in a 0–0 against Hungary at the 1982 World Cup qualifiers. In his last game played for the national team, he managed to score his only goal in a 3–2 victory against Israel.

Honours

Club
Universitatea Cluj-Napoca
Divizia B: 1978–79, 1984–85
Steaua București
Cupa României runner-up: 1983–84

Individual
Total matches played in Romanian First League: 277 matches – 117 goals.
Topscorer of Romanian First League: 1979–80.
Olympic team: 2 matches – 0 goal
Under 21 team: 4 goals – 0 goal

References

External links

1957 births
Living people
Sportspeople from Cluj-Napoca
Romanian footballers
Romania international footballers
Liga I players
Liga II players
FC Steaua București players
FC Universitatea Cluj players
Association football forwards
Romanian expatriate footballers
Expatriate footballers in West Germany
Romanian expatriate sportspeople in West Germany